This is a list of the main career statistics of retired professional tennis player Anna Kournikova.

Significant finals

Singles

WTA Tier I

Doubles

Grand Slam

WTA Tour Championships

WTA Tier I

Mixed doubles

Grand Slam

WTA Tour finals

Singles (4)

Runners-up (4)

Doubles (28)

Wins (16)

Runners-up (12)

ITF Circuit finals

Singles: 2 (2–0)

Doubles (0–1)

Singles performance timeline

Doubles performance timeline

Head vs. Head Record
Jennifer Capriati 3-1
Arantxa Sánchez Vicario 3-2
Daniela Hantuchová 2-0
Elena Dementieva 1-0
Nadia Petrova 1-0
Anastasia Myskina 0-1
Dinara Safina 0-1
Amélie Mauresmo 1-2
Steffi Graf 1-2
Jelena Dokic 0-2
Dominique Monami 0-2
Serena Williams 0-2
Kim Clijsters 1-4
Justine Henin 0-4
Monica Seles 1-5
Lindsay Davenport 3-7
Venus Williams 0-8
Martina Hingis 1-11

WTA Tour career earnings

References

External links 
 Official website of Anna Kournikova
 Anna Kournikova at the WTA Tour's official website

Kournikova, Anna